Gier Choung Aloung is a South Sudanese politician. He served as Minister of Internal Affairs in the Cabinet of South Sudan. He was appointed to that position on 10 July 2011.

External links
Website of Government of South Sudan

See also
 SPLM
 SPLA
 Cabinet of South Sudan

References

Living people
Government ministers of South Sudan
Year of birth missing (living people)